The Medal of Liberty was awarded in 1986 by President Ronald Reagan as part of the festivities commemorating the 100th anniversary of the Statue of Liberty (Liberty Enlightening the World). The awarding of this medal took place only once, as it was linked to a specific event. No other Medals of Liberty have been awarded since Liberty Weekend 1986, although it is possible more may be awarded on future occasions.

History
The medal was awarded in 1986 by President Reagan to twelve outstanding individuals chosen as representative of the most distinguished naturalized citizens of the United States of America. David L. Wolper, producer of ABC's television's 1986 Independence Day Weekend media event, came up with the idea to have the President present awards to a select group of naturalized citizens as an essential part of the ceremonial festivities commemorating the 100th anniversary of the dedication of the Statue of Liberty in New York Harbor.

Design
The Medal of Liberty is a circular, bronze medallion, seven inches in diameter, hand finished and patinated by Alex Shagin. On the obverse of the medal is the bust of Frédéric Bartholdi, facing slightly to the right and holding in his right hand his small bronze sculpture of Liberty Enlightening the World, his template for the construction of the Statue of Liberty National Monument at the mouth of the Hudson River in New York Harbor.  Bartholdi's name appears vertically, his middle name, Auguste, to the left of his bust and his surname to the right.

Recipients

Medal recipients were announced by Ted Koppel of ABC News. 

As of October 2020, Chang Díaz, Holborn Gray, Kissinger, and Perlman are the only living members of the Medal of Liberty.

External links

 President Reagan's July 3, 1986 Remarks at the Opening Ceremonies of the Statue of Liberty Centennial Celebration in New York, New York
 President Reagan's July 3, 1986 Remarks on the Lighting of the Torch of the Statue of Liberty in New York, New York

1986 awards in the United States
Statue of Liberty